Xu Qiling (born July 1962) is a general (Shangjiang) of the People's Liberation Army (PLA). He was the commander of the Western Theater Command. He formerly served as commander of the Western Theater Command Ground Force, commander of the Eastern Theater Command Ground Force, and commander of the 79th Group Army.

Biography
Born in Huaiyang District, Zhoukou, Henan in July 1962, Xu served in Jinan Military Region before serving as the chief of staff for the 54th Group Army. He served as deputy commander of the Central Theater Command in 2016 and held that office until March 2017, when he was appointed commander of the 79th Group Army. He rose in rank to become commander of the Eastern Theater Command Ground Force in December 2018, replacing Qin Weijiang.  In April 2020, Xu was transferred to the Western Theater Command and appointed commander of its ground force.

Xu was awarded the rank of lieutenant general by the Central Military Commission Chairman Xi Jinping on 11 December 2019 and later to the rank of general on 5 July 2021.

In June 2021, Xu was chosen to replace Zhang Xudong as commander of the Western Theater Command after Zhang left the post suffering from cancer and gastrointestinal problems. Zhang died four months later in October. After only two months serving as commander, Xu also stepped down reportedly also out of poor health and amid a number of illnesses among both commanders and troops. Xu was transferred to the Joint Staff Department of the Central Military Commission (CMC) to serve as vice chief.

Xu was a delegate to the 13th National People's Congress.

References

1962 births
People from Zhoukou
Living people
People's Liberation Army generals from Henan